Sabine Baring-Gould (28 January 1834 – 2 January 1924) of Lew Trenchard in Devon, England, was an Anglican priest, hagiographer, antiquarian, novelist, folk song collector and eclectic scholar. His bibliography consists of more than 1,240 publications, though this list continues to grow. His family home, the manor house of Lew Trenchard, near Okehampton, Devon, has been preserved as he had it rebuilt and is now a hotel. He is remembered particularly as a writer of hymns, the best-known being "Onward, Christian Soldiers", "Sing Lullaby", and "Now the Day Is Over". He also translated the carol "Gabriel's Message" from the Basque language to English.

Origins

Sabine Baring-Gould was born in the parish of St Sidwell, Exeter, on 28 January 1834. He was the eldest son and heir of Edward Baring-Gould (1804–1872), lord of the manor of Lew Trenchard, a Justice of the Peace and Deputy Lieutenant of Devon, formerly a lieutenant in the Madras Light Cavalry (resigned 1830), by his first wife, Sophia Charlotte Bond, daughter of Admiral Francis Godolphin Bond, Royal Navy.
Sabine's paternal grandfather was William Baring (died 1846), JP, DL, who in 1795 had assumed by royal licence the additional surname and arms of Gould, in accordance with the terms of his inheritance of the manor of Lew Trenchard from his mother Margaret Gould, daughter and eventual heiress in her issue of William Drake Gould (1719–1767) of Lew Trenchard. The Gould family was descended from a certain John Gold, a crusader present at the siege of Damietta in 1217 who for his valour  was granted in 1220 by Ralph de Vallibus  an estate at Seaborough in Somerset. Margaret Gould was the wife of Charles Baring (1742–1829) of Courtland in the parish of Exmouth, Devon, whose monument survives in Lympstone Church, 4th son of Johann Baring (1697–1748), of Larkbeare House, Exeter, a German immigrant apprenticed to an Exeter wool merchant, and younger brother of Francis Baring (1740–1810), and John Baring (1730–1816) of Mount Radford, Exeter, which latter two established the London merchant house of John and Francis Baring Company, which eventually became Barings Bank.

Sabine was named after the family of his grandmother, Diana Amelia Sabine (died 1858), wife of William Baring-Gould (died 1846), daughter of Joseph Sabine of Tewin, Hertfordshire and sister of the Arctic explorer General Sir Edward Sabine.

Career

Because the family spent much of his childhood travelling round Europe, most of his education was by private tutors. He only spent about two years in formal schooling, first at King's College School in London (then located in Somerset House) and then, for a few months, at King's School, Warwick (now Warwick School). Here his time was ended by a bronchial disease of the kind that was to plague him throughout his long life. His father considered his ill-health as a good reason for another European tour.

In 1852 he was admitted to Cambridge University, earning the degrees of Bachelor of Arts in 1857, then Master of Arts in 1860 from Clare College, Cambridge.  In September 1853 he informed Nathaniel Woodard of his desire to be ordained. He taught for only ten days at one of Woodard's boys' boarding schools in Sussex, Lancing College, but then moved to another, Hurstpierpoint College, where he stayed from 1857 to 1864. While there he was responsible for several subjects, especially languages and science, and he also designed the ironwork of the bookcases in the boys' library, as well as painting the window jambs with scenes from the Canterbury Tales and  The Faerie Queene.

He took Holy Orders in 1864, and became the curate at Horbury Bridge, West Riding of Yorkshire. It was while acting as a curate that he met Grace Taylor, the daughter of a mill hand, then aged fourteen. In the next few years they fell in love. His vicar, John Sharp, arranged for Grace to live for two years with relatives in York to learn middle-class manners. Baring-Gould, meanwhile, relocated to become perpetual curate at Dalton, near Thirsk. He and Grace were married in 1868 at Wakefield.
Their marriage lasted until her death 48 years later, and the couple had 15 children, all but one of whom lived to adulthood. When he buried his wife in 1916 he had carved on her tombstone the Latin motto Dimidium Animae Meae ("Half my Soul").

Baring-Gould became the rector of East Mersea in Essex in 1871 and spent ten years there. In 1872 his father died and he inherited the  family estates of Lewtrenchard in Devon, which included the gift of the living of Lew Trenchard parish. When the living became vacant in 1881, he was able to appoint himself to it, becoming parson as well as squire. He did a great deal of work restoring St Peter's Church, Lew Trenchard, and (from 1883 to 1914) thoroughly remodelled his home, Lew Trenchard Manor.

Folk songs

Baring-Gould regarded his principal achievement to be the collection of folk songs that he made with the help of the ordinary people of Cornwall and Devon. His first book of songs, Songs and Ballads of the West (1889–91), was published in four parts between 1889 and 1891. The musical editor for this collection was Henry Fleetwood Sheppard, though some of the songs included were noted by Baring-Gould's other collaborator Frederick Bussell.

Baring-Gould and Sheppard produced a second collection named A Garland of Country Songs during 1895. A new edition of Songs of the West was proposed for publication in 1905. Sheppard had died in 1901, and so the folk song collector Cecil Sharp was invited to undertake the musical editorship for the new edition. Sharp and Baring-Gould also collaborated on English Folk Songs for Schools during 1907. This collection of 53 songs was widely used in British schools for the next 60 years.

Although he had to modify the words of some songs which were too rude for the time, he left his original manuscripts for future students of folk song, thereby preserving many beautiful pieces of music and their lyrics which might otherwise have been lost.

Baring-Gould gave the fair copies of the folk songs he collected, together with the notebooks he used for gathering information in the field, to Plymouth Public Library in 1914. They were deposited with the Plymouth and West Devon Record Office in 2006. These, together with the folk-song manuscripts from Baring-Gould's library discovered at Killerton in 1998, were published as a microfiche edition in 1998. In 2011 the complete collection of his folk-song manuscripts, including two notebooks not in the microfiche edition, were digitised and published online by the Devon Tradition Project managed by Wren Music in association with the English Folk Dance and Song Society as part of the "Take Six" project undertaken by the Vaughan Williams Memorial Library. It now forms part of the VWML's "Full English" website. Thirty boxes of additional manuscript material on other topics (the Killerton manuscripts) are kept in the Devon History Centre in Exeter.

Cecil Sharp dedicated his book English Folk Song: Some Conclusions (1907) to Baring-Gould.

Literature
Baring-Gould wrote many novels, including The Broom-Squire set in the Devil's Punch Bowl (1896), Mehalah: a story of the salt marshes (1880), Guavas the Tinner (1897), the 16-volume The Lives of the Saints, and the biography of the eccentric poet-vicar of Morwenstow, Robert Stephen Hawker. He also published nearly 200 short stories in assorted magazines and periodicals. Many of these short stories were collected together and republished as anthologies, such as his Book of Ghosts (1904), Dartmoor Idyllys (1896), and In a Quiet Village (1900). His folkloric studies resulted in The Book of Were-Wolves (1865), one of the most frequently cited studies of lycanthropy. He habitually wrote while standing, and his desk can be seen in the manor.

One of his most enduringly popular works was Curious Myths of the Middle Ages, first published in two parts during 1866 and 1868, and republished in many other editions since then. "Each of the book's twenty-four chapters deals with a particular medieval superstition and its variants and antecedents," writes critic Steven J. Mariconda. H. P. Lovecraft termed it "that curious body of medieval lore which the late Mr. Baring-Gould so effectively assembled in book form."

He wrote much about the West Country: his works of this topic include:
 A Book of the West. 2 vols. I: Devon; II: Cornwall. London : Methuen, 1899
 Cornish Characters and Strange Events. London: John Lane, 1909 (reissued in 1925 in 2 vols., First series and Second series)
 Devonshire Characters and Strange Events.

Baring-Gould served as president of the Royal Institution of Cornwall for ten years from 1897.

Dartmoor
Baring-Gould, along with his friend Robert Burnard, organised the first scientific archaeological excavations of hut-circles on Dartmoor at Grimspound during 1893. They then asked R. N. Worth, R. Hansford Worth, W. A. G. Gray and a Dr Prowse to assist them with further investigations. This resulted in the formation of the Committee of the Devonshire Association for the exploration of Dartmoor. Baring-Gould was the secretary and author of the first ten annual reports until 1905. The Dartmoor Exploration Committee performed many archaeological digs of prehistoric settlements on Dartmoor and systematically recorded and in some cases restored prehistoric sites. The current state of many prehistoric stone rows and stone circles on Dartmoor owes much to the work of Sabine Baring-Gould and Robert Burnard and the Dartmoor Exploration Committee. Baring-Gould was president of the Devonshire Association for the year 1896.

He wrote much about Dartmoor: his works of this topic include:
 Dartmoor idylls (1896)
 A Book of Dartmoor (1900), London : Methuen, 1900. Republished Halsgrove, 2002

Family
He married Grace Taylor on 25 May 1868 at Horbury. They had 15 children: Mary (born 1869), Margaret Daisy (born 1870, an artist who painted part of the screen in Lew Trenchard Church), Edward Sabine (born 1871), Beatrice Gracieuse (1874–1876, aged 2 years), Veronica (born 1875), Julian (born 1877), William Drake (born 1878), Barbara (born 1880), Diana Amelia (born 1881), Felicitas (baptised 1883), Henry (born 1885), Joan (born 1887), Cecily Sophia (born 1889), John Hillary (born 1890), and Grace (born 1891).

His wife Grace died in April 1916, and he did not remarry; he died on 2 January 1924 at his home at Lew Trenchard and was buried next to his wife.

He wrote two volumes of memoirs: Early Reminiscences, 1834–1864 (1923) and Further Reminiscences, 1864–1894 (1925).

One grandson, William Stuart Baring-Gould, was a noted Sherlock Holmes scholar who wrote a fictional biography of the great detective—in which, to make up for the lack of information about Holmes's early life, he based his account on the childhood of Sabine Baring-Gould. Sabine himself is a major character of Laurie R. King's Sherlock Holmes novel The Moor, a Sherlockian pastiche.  In this novel it is revealed that Sabine Baring-Gould is the godfather of Sherlock Holmes.

Radio actor Robert Burnard was also his grandson, and comedian Josh Widdicombe is a distant descendant.

List of works

 A Book of the Pyrenees (1907)
 Court Royal (1891)
 A Book of Dartmoor (1900)
 A Book of North Wales (1903)
 Amazing Adventures, illustrated by Harry B. Neilson (1903)
 A Book of Ghosts (1904)
"Jean Bouchon", "Pomps and Vanities", "McAlister", "The Leaden Ring", "The Mother of Pansies", "The Red-haired Girl", "A Professional Secret", "H. P.", "Glámr", "Colonel Halifax's Ghost Story", "The Merewigs", "The 'Bold Venture", "Mustapha", "Little Joe Gander", "A Dead Finger", "Black Ram", "A Happy Release", "The 9.30 Up-train", "On the Leads", "Aunt Joanna", "The White Flag"
 A Book of South Wales (1905)
 A Book of the Rhine from Cleve to Mainz (1906)
 A Book of the West: Being an Introduction to Devon and Cornwall (2 Volumes, 1899) 
 A First Series of Village Preaching for a Year
 A Second Series of Village Preaching for a Year
 An Old English Home and its Dependencies, London, 1898
 Arminell
 Bladys of the Stewponey (1919)
 The Evangelical Review (1920)
 Cliff Castles and Cave Dwellings of Europe
 Cheap Jack Zita (1896)
 Cornish Characters (1909)
 Curiosities of Olden Times (1896)
 Curious Myths of the Middle Ages (1866)
 Dartmoor Idylls (1896)
 Devon (1907) (Methuen's Little Guide on Devonshire) 
 Devon Characters and Strange Events (1908)
 Domitia (1898)
 Eve
 Family Names and their story (1910)
 Grettir the Outlaw: a story of Iceland (1890)
 Iceland, Its Scenes and Its Sagas
 In Dewisland (1904)
 In the Roar of the Sea (1891)
 In Troubadour Land: A Ramble in Provence and Languedoc (1890)
 John Herring
 Lives of the Saints, in sixteen volumes (1897)
 Legends of the Patriarchs and Prophets (from the fall of the angels to the death of Solomon).
 The lost and hostile gospels an essay on the Toledoth Jeschu, and the Petrine and Pauline gospels of the first three centuries of which fragments remain (1874)
 Mehalah, A Story of the Salt Marshes (1880)
 Noemi
 Old Country Life (1889)
 One Hundred Sermon Sketches for Extempore Preachers (1877)
 Pabo, The Priest (1899)
 Red Spider (1887)
 Richard Cable (1888)
 Sermons on the Seven Last words
 Sermons to Children
 Songs of the West: Folksongs of Devon & Cornwall (1905)
 The Book of Were-Wolves, being an account of a terrible superstition (1865)
 The Broom-Squire (1896)
 The Gaverocks
 The Life of Napoleon Bonaparte (1908)
 The Lives of the Saints – a sixteen-volume collection (1872 and 1877)
 The Mystery of Suffering
 The Pennycomequicks
 The Preacher's Pocket
 Post-Mediaeval Preachers, (1865)
 The Tragedy of the Caesars (1892)
 Troubadour-Land: A Ramble in Provence and Languedoc (1891), illustrated by James Edward Rogers 
  The Village Pulpit (1886)
 The Vicar of Morwenstow, being a life of Robert Stephen Hawker (1876)
 Urith
 Village Preaching for Saints' Days

References

Citations

Sources

Further reading

 Baring-Gould, S. (1923 & 1925) Early Reminiscences 1834-1864 & Further Reminiscences 1864-1894. London, John Lane, The Bodley Head
 Frykman, G. C. & Hadley, E. J. (2004) Warwick School: a History 
 Purcell, William (1957) Onward Christian Soldier: a Life of Sabine Baring-Gould, parson, squire, novelist, antiquary, 1834–1924, with an introduction by John Betjeman. London: Longmans, Green
 Lister, Keith (2002) 'Half my life' : The Story of Sabine Baring-Gould and Grace (Wakefield: Charnwood)
 Graebe, Martin (2017) As I walked out : Sabine Baring-Gould and the search for the folk songs of Devon and Cornwall (Oxford: Signal Books)

External links

Biography and hymns of Sabine Baring-Gould at Hymnary.org
Biography from Devon Discovering Devon by the BBC
Sabine Baring-Gould Appreciation Society
Devon Tradition Project
Early Family Correspondence of Sabine Baring-Gould
 
 
 Portrait of Baring-Gould on the Art UK website

Works
 
 
 
 
 
 
 
'Songs of the West' – Sabine Baring-Gould and the Folk Songs of South-West England
Mehala full text at All Things Ransome
Archives of the English Folk Dance and Song Society (search for "Baring-Gould" in "collectors")

1834 births
1924 deaths
19th-century English male writers
19th-century English novelists
20th-century English male writers
20th-century English novelists
20th-century biographers
Alumni of Clare College, Cambridge
Sabine
Burials in Devon
Church of England hymnwriters
Dartmoor
English Anglicans
English biographers
English folk-song collectors
English folklorists
English male non-fiction writers
English male novelists
Historians of Cornwall
Historians of Devon
Male biographers
Musicians from Devon
People educated at Warwick School
19th-century musicologists